Navin Khanna (born 1 April 1962) is an Indian businessman. Khanna's business interests are in the commodities, food and beverage industries. His name appeared in the International Consortium of Investigative Journalists' Offshore Leaks report in 2013. Khanna has also been a noted polo player and has contributed towards growing the popularity of the sport in India.

Early life 
Navin Khanna was born on 1 April 1962 in Delhi, India. Khanna is the second child and eldest son of business magnate, Vipin Khanna and Naginder Khanna. His mother, Naginder, was the daughter of Maharaja Bhupinder Singh of Patiala. Khanna's elder sister is Vinita, and his younger brothers are Arvind and Aditya.

Business career 
Khanna is a director in various Indian companies, and his business interests are in the commodities, food and beverage industries. He has been a director in his father Vipin Khanna's Dynamic Sales Service International (DSSI) group of companies. Khanna is a director in Oilex Trading, a commodities trading and marketing company, which was founded in 2006. Oilex Trading trades coal, petroleum, fertiliser, sugar, molasses, and ethanol.

Offshore Leaks report 
Khanna's name appeared in the Offshore Leaks report. In 2013, the International Consortium of Investigative Journalists (ICIJ) produced, from the leaks of 2.5 million files and other forms of data, information of over 100,000 anonymous owners of secret offshore companies, funds and trusts located in offshore tax havens, and predominantly in the British Virgin Islands. The Offshore Leaks report was one of the earliest leaks of its kind in a series of offshore related leaks that also includes the Panama Papers in 2016, Paradise Papers in 2017 and Pandora Papers in 2021. Khanna was the shareholder of Victoria Road Investments Limited, a company that was linked to the British Virgin Islands and had a registered address in London, England, from 2009 to an unknown date.

Polo 
Khanna has been a noted polo player in India. He has also been among the businesspeople who have been credited with popularising polo in India through either owning their own teams or sponsoring tournaments. Khanna has owned a polo team and has played for other teams as well. From 2004 to 2009, Khanna owned his own polo team that had 20 polo ponies and was a successful team in the lower to middle handicap tournaments within India. Khanna was one of the co-founders of the Haryana Polo Club, which was founded in 2001, and was also one of the club's patrons. In 2014, he was a provisional member of the San Diego Polo Club.  

Khanna has also competed in polo tournaments in India. In 2001, he competed in the Hanut Cup while playing for the Ramgarh polo team and scored three goals in a match against Royal Kashmir. Khanna has also played for the Teachers polo team. In 2002, he won the Pataudi Cup at the Jaipur Polo Ground while playing for Teachers. In November 2003, Khanna scored a goal in a Teachers loss to Royal Kashmir in the quarter-finals of the Maharaja Hari Singh Cup Polo Tournament. In December 2003, he scored two goals in a Teachers win against 61 Cavalry polo team in the Habanos Cavalry Gold Cup. In 2004, Khanna competed in the ITC Maurya Sheraton Polo Trophy. 

In December 2009, on New Years's Eve, he played in a beach polo exhibition game held in Goa. In February 2010, Khanna played for Pioneer Urban Sanawar against Thunderbolt in the Sanawar Polo Match. The Sanawar Polo Match was an exhibition game and the proceeds earned from the match were given to The Lawrence School, Sanawar. In 2014, he played for Aravali Polo in the Amity Polo Cup, and lost to Action Polo in the tournament. In 2015, Khanna competed in the polo season in the United Kingdom.

Personal life 
Khanna is married to Kavita Khanna. They have two children: Rahul and Ahilya. His son Rahul is a British Indian restaurateur based in London. Rahul runs the Tamarind Collection, a restaurant group in London that was founded by his family. Tamarind Collection comprises of the restaurants: Tamarind in Mayfair, Tamarind Kitchen in Soho and Zaika in Kensington.

References 

1962 births
Indian polo players
Khanna family
Living people
Punjabi Hindus
Businesspeople from Delhi
Indian commodities traders